Hopeland is a small unincorporated hamlet and census-designated place (CDP) in Lancaster County in the south of the U.S. state of Pennsylvania. The hamlet's ZIP code is 17533. As of the 2010 census the population was 738.

The community is in northern Lancaster County, in western Clay Township. A small portion extends south into Elizabeth Township. It is bordered to the southwest by Brickerville and to the southeast by Clay, both unincorporated. U.S. Route 322 (28th Division Highway) passes through the south end of the community, leading northwest  to Quentin and southeast  to Ephrata.

The community is drained by Middle Creek and its tributary Furnace Run, flowing south to Cocalico Creek and part of the Conestoga River watershed leading to the Susquehanna River.

Demographics

References

Census-designated places in Lancaster County, Pennsylvania
Census-designated places in Pennsylvania